Time Well Wasted is the fourth studio album released by American country music artist Brad Paisley. It was released on August 16, 2005, on Arista Nashville. It was the Country Music Association's Album of the Year for 2006.

The album produced the singles "Alcohol", "When I Get Where I'm Going", "The World", and "She's Everything". "Alcohol" was a number 4 hit on the Billboard Hot Country Songs charts, while the other three singles were all Number Ones. "Waitin' on a Woman" was re-recorded in mid-2008 as a bonus track for Paisley's 5th Gear album, and this re-recording was issued in June 2008 as a single.

Content
The first single from Time Well Wasted was "Alcohol", which reached a peak of number 4 on the Billboard country charts in mid-2005. After it came "When I Get Where I'm Going", featuring background vocals from Dolly Parton. This song became Paisley's fifth Number One and Parton's twenty-fifth, as well as her first since the Ricky Van Shelton duet "Rockin' Years" in 1991. It also made her the oldest female artist to have a Number One hit on the country charts.

"The World", the third single, became Paisley's highest-debuting single when it entered the charts at number 37, and was his sixth Number One. Finishing off the single releases was "She's Everything", also a Number One. "Waitin' on a Woman", a cut from this album, was re-recorded and released to radio in 2008, and was added to his next studio album, 2007's 5th Gear. Upon its reaching Number One, the re-recording of "Waitin' on a Woman" became Paisley's eighth Number One in a row, setting a new record for the most consecutive country Number One hits since the inception of Nielsen SoundScan in 1990.

Track listing

Personnel 
As listed in liner notes.
 Brad Paisley – lead vocals (1-13, 15-16), electric guitar, acoustic guitar, baritone guitar, 12-string electric guitar, hi-string acoustic guitar, mandolin
 Jim "Moose" Brown – acoustic piano, keyboards, Hammond organ, backing vocals
 Bernie Herms – acoustic piano
 Gordon Mote – keyboards 
 Gary Hooker – electric guitar, 12-string electric guitar, backing vocals
 James Burton – electric guitar (16)
 Kendal Marcy – banjo, backing vocals
 Randle Currie – steel guitar
 Jerry Douglas – dobro
 Mike Johnson – dobro, steel guitar
 Bryan Sutton – mandolin
 Kevin Grantt – bass guitar, tic tac bass, upright bass, backing vocals
 Kenny Lewis – bass guitar, backing vocals
 Bobby Terry – bass guitar
 Ben Sesar – drums
 Eric Darken – percussion, vibraphone
 Stuart Duncan – fiddle, mandolin
 Justin Williamson – fiddle
 Wes Hightower – backing vocals
 Scott Hamilton and "The 12 Steps" – gang vocals (2)
 Robert Arthur and Tim Owens – "cry babies" (4)
 Alan Jackson – lead and harmony vocals (7)
 Dolly Parton – harmony vocals (12)
 "The Kung Pao Buckaroos" (George Jones, Little Jimmy Dickens and Bill Anderson, with Dolly Parton as "Miss Kitty") – featured vocals (16)
 William Shatner – featured vocals (21)

Production 
 Frank Rogers – producer 
 Chris DuBois – executive producer 
 Richard Barrow – recording 
 Brian David Willis – recording, digital editing
 Justin Niebank – mixing 
 Brady Barnett – digital editing
 Adam Hatley – digital editing 
 Hank Williams – mastering 
 MasterMix (Nashville, Tennessee) – mastering location 
 Katherine Stratton – art direction, design 
 Brad Paisley – design 
 Jim Shea – photography 
 Fitzgerald Hartley – management

Chart performance

Weekly charts

Year-end charts

Singles

Certifications

Album Cover
The clock hanging on the guitar seen on the album cover is an homage to The Persistence of Memory by Salvador Dalí.

References

2005 albums
Brad Paisley albums
Arista Records albums
Albums produced by Frank Rogers (record producer)